Tinodes is a genus of caddisflies belonging to the family Psychomyiidae.

The genus was first described by John Curtis in 1834.

The genus has cosmopolitan distribution.

Species:
 Tinodes aberrans Kimmins, 1962
 Tinodes waeneri

References

Trichoptera
Trichoptera genera